The 1945 All-Ireland Senior Hurling Championship Final was the 58th All-Ireland Final and the culmination of the 1945 All-Ireland Senior Hurling Championship, an inter-county hurling tournament for the top teams in Ireland. The match was held at Croke Park, Dublin, on 2 September 1945, between Kilkenny and Tipperary. The Leinster champions lost to their Munster opponents on a score line of 5-6 to 3-6.

Match details

1
All-Ireland Senior Hurling Championship Finals
Kilkenny GAA matches
Tipperary GAA matches
All-Ireland Senior Hurling Championship Final
All-Ireland Senior Hurling Championship Final, 1945